Pongwe is an administrative ward in Tanga District of Tanga Region in Tanzania.
According to the 2012 census, the ward has a total population of 13,513.

References

Wards of Tanga Region